Hotel Hell is an American reality television series created, hosted and narrated by Gordon Ramsay, which ran on the Fox network for three seasons from 2012 to 2016. It aired on Monday nights at 8 pm ET/PT. It was Ramsay's fourth series for the Fox network.

The series features Ramsay visiting various struggling lodging establishments throughout the United States in an attempt to reverse their misfortunes, following a similar concept established in Ramsay's other programs, Ramsay's Kitchen Nightmares and its American counterpart, Kitchen Nightmares.

Broadcast
Originally scheduled to premiere on Fox at 8 pm ET/PT on Friday, April 6, 2012, the series was first rescheduled to Monday, June 4, 2012 at 8 pm ET/PT, in order to accommodate the move of The Finder to Fridays, then rescheduled to August 13, due to Ramsay's other two series, Hell's Kitchen and MasterChef, being scheduled for Monday nights during the summer.

The series' first season, which consisted of six episodes, ended on September 3, 2012. On August 31, 2012, Fox renewed Hotel Hell for a second season, which premiered on July 21, 2014.

Episodes

Series overview

Season 1 (2012)

Season 2 (2014)

Season 3 (2016)

See also

 Hotel Impossible
 The Hotel Inspector

References

General references

External links

 
 

2012 American television series debuts
2016 American television series endings
2010s American reality television series
English-language television shows
Television series by All3Media
Fox Broadcasting Company original programming
Hotels in the United States
Television shows featuring audio description
2010s American workplace television series